Maxim Vyacheslavovich Samosvat (born 15 June 1981, in Moscow), is a Russian rock musician, vocalist of Mechanical Poet, (2003–2006) and Epidemia (2000–2010).

Biography 
His first band was Orcrist, which included future members of Epidemia: Ilya Knyazev and Roman Zakharov. Early in his career has performed with groups such as the Lady Prowler, Strangers, and Travel to the Night.

Since 2000 is the vocalist in the Russian power metal band "Epidemia", which was replaced by Pavel Okunev (now – Arda). His first job was with the group album "Magical Mystery Countries" in 2001.

In 2004 the group, in collaboration with other well-known Russian singers – Arthur Berkut (Aria), Lexx (Master), Andrey Lobashev (Arida Vortex), Cyril Nemolyaev (Boney NEM), Dmitry Borisenkov (Black Obelisk) – Records Russia's first metal opera, "Elven Manuscript", where Max played the role of Desmond – half-elf.

In 2005, Epidemia has released his fifth album, numbered, titled "Living in Twilight". The record contains a rewrite of songs from the first album, track list determined fans through Internet.

In 2006 Samosvat participated in the recording of Master – "On the other side of sleep" in the project Margenta on the verses Margarita Pushkina. Maxim song "Za granyu" Samosvat also participated in the recording of the band's albums Everlost – Noise Factory and Hatecraft – Lost Consolation.

In 2007 he published a sequel to Elven Manuscript – Elven Manuscript 2: Saga For All Times. The record also was full of famous names: the already involved in the first part of the metal opera Berkut, Lobashev, Borisenkov and Nemolyaev joined by Mikhayl Seryshev (ex-Master), Konstantin Rumyantsev (Troll Gnet El) Ekaterina Belobrova (The Teachers), Eugeny Egorov (Epidemia). In this metal opera Maxim again sang the role of Desmond.

Just Maxim was a singer for progressive rock group Mechanical Poet. With his participation were recorded two albums: 2003 – Handmade Essence, and in 2004 – Woodland Prattlers. In 2005, Maxim was invited to attend the reunion of Mechanical Poet, but preferred Epidemia. His place in Mechanical Poet was taken by Jerry Lenin.

On 25 October 2010 Maxim announced his retirement from Epidemia. Recent performances with a group of 12/10/2010 held in St. Petersburg and in Moscow 12/11/2010.

Discography

Epidemia 
 Загадка волшебной страны – The Quest of the Magic Land (2001)
 Эльфийская рукопись – Elven Manuscript (2004)
 Жизнь в сумерках – Living in Twilight (2005)
 Эльфийская рукопись: Сказание на все времена – Elven Manuscript 2: Saga For All Times (2007)
 Сумеречный Ангел – Angel of Twilight (Single) (2009)
 Дорога домой – Road to Home (2010)

Mechanical Poet 
 Handmade Essence (2003)
 Woodland Prattlers (2004)

Others 
 Hatecraft – Lost Consolation (2005)
 Catharsis – Крылья (Krylya) (2005)
 Мастер – По ту сторону сна (The Other Side of a Dream) (2006)
 Фактор страха – Театр Военных Действий, Акт 1 (Theater of War. Act 1)) (2005)
 Everlost – Noise Factory (2006)
 Алексей Страйк – Время полной луны (The time of full moon) (2005)
 Бони НЕМ – Тяжелые Песни О Главном. Часть 2 – Hard Songs about Main. Chapter 2 (2008) – guest vocals
 Ольви – Сказочный сон – Dreaming Sleep (2009)

External links
 Интерактив: вопросы-ответы (ru)
 HeavyMusic.ru. Интервью с Максимом Самосватом(ru)
 Прощальная Речь Максима Самосвата(ru)

1981 births
Living people
Russian rock musicians